The Fairview Community Center, at 206 E. Broadway in Fairview, Oklahoma in Major County, Oklahoma, was built in 1939.  It was listed on the National Register of Historic Places in 2015.

It was deemed significant for its association with the Public Works Administration.  It was designed by John C. Hope, an Oklahoma City architect.

The only other two buildings in Fairview built by a New Deal era program are:
WPA-built fire station, since demolished
the Major County Exhibit/Livestock Building, also WPA-built, which has been modified by a standing seam roofing system addition.

Note: This is misidentified by the National Register as being in Oklahoma County.

References

National Register of Historic Places in Major County, Oklahoma
Buildings and structures completed in 1939